The Pyramid (1967) is a novel by the English author, William Golding.

Plot
It describes the experiences of growing up in the 1920s in a small market town in England of the narrator, Oliver. It tells three separate stories from his childhood, resolving them many years later. All three stories end with Oliver seeing the other main character for the last time.

1967 British novels
Novels by William Golding
Faber and Faber books
Fiction set in the 1920s